SJAB may refer to:
SJ AB, a Swedish passenger train operator
St John Ambulance Brigade, one of two traditional divisions of the first-aid charity St John Ambulance